Karen Lynne Arvon (born May 29, 1961 in South Charleston, West Virginia) is an American politician and was a Republican member of the West Virginia Senate representing the 9th district. Prior to this, Arvon represented the 31st district in the West Virginia House of Delegates since January 12, 2013.

Education
Arvon earned her associate degree from Marshall University and her BS in business administration from West Virginia State University.

Private career
Arvon is the office manager for MyCare Inc., her husband's direct primary care facility.

Political career
With district 31 incumbent Democratic Representative Meshea Poore running in district 37 due to redistricting, Arvon was unopposed for the May 8, 2012 Republican primary, winning with 715 votes, and won the November 6, 2012 general election with 3,191 votes (51.2%) against Democratic nominee Clyde McKnight.

Arvon was appointed by Gov. Jim Justice to the district 9 Senate seat in January, 2018. The seat had previously been held by Jeff Mullins, who resigned on January 12, 2018, citing business and family obligations.

Personal life
Avron is married to Matthew Arvon, with whom she has three children.

References

External links
Official page at the West Virginia Legislature

Karen "Lynne" Arvon at Ballotpedia
Karen (Lynne) Arvon at the National Institute on Money in State Politics

1961 births
Living people
Marshall University alumni
Republican Party members of the West Virginia House of Delegates
Politicians from Beckley, West Virginia
People from South Charleston, West Virginia
Republican Party West Virginia state senators
West Virginia State University alumni
Women state legislators in West Virginia
21st-century American politicians
21st-century American women politicians